Swedish Army Signal Troops (S) is the signal branch of the Swedish Army.

History
The Swedish Army Signal Troops were organized in accordance with the Defence Act of 1936 as a special branch of the field telegraph troops which belonged to the Fortifikationen. The signal troops consisted of the Signal Regiment (S 1) with the main part in Stockholm Garrison and a company in each of Kristianstad Garrison (S 1 K), Skövde Garrison (S 1 Sk) and Boden Garrison (S 1 B). From the signal troops, a large number of officers were also commanded for service in senior staffs.

Units, except regiments, battalions, corps and companies of the Swedish Army Signal Troops, included the Swedish Army Signal School (1942–1965) which became the Swedish Army School of Staff Work and Communications (Arméns stabs- och sambandsskola, StabSbS) (1965–1998) which in turn was part of the Swedish Army Staff and Communication Center (Arméns lednings- och sambandscentrum, LSC) (1991–1997) along with the Army Staff's Signal Department (Arméstabens signalavdelning) and (Signaltruppernas officershögskola, SignOHS). The Swedish Army Signal Cadet and Officer Candidate School (Signaltruppernas kadett- och aspirantskola, SignKAS) was active from 1961 to 1981 when it became a part of the Swedish Army School of Staff Work and Communications.

Today's signal troops mainly include staff and military communications units, and electronic warfare units. The Command and Control Regiment in Enköping has since 2007 taken over the previous tasks of the signal troops.

Inspector of the Swedish Army Signal Troops
In the years 1966-1991, the signal and engineer troops had a joint branch inspector; the Inspector of the Swedish Army Engineer Corps and Signal Corps (Ingenjörinspektör- och Signalinspektören). From 1991, the two branches received an inspector each, and the title of the signal troops was shortened to the Signal Inspector. In connection with the decommissioning of Swedish Army Staff and Communication Center (Arméns lednings- och sambandscentrum), the position of Signal Inspector disappeared.

1942–1948: Gottfried Hain
1948–1954: Åke Sundberg
1954–1955: Hilding Kring
1955–1959: Fale Burman
1959–1962: Gunnar af Klintberg
1962–1966: Bengt Uller
1966–1967: Gunnar Smedmark
1967–1967: Harald Smith (acting)
1968–1969: Harald Smith
1969–1975: Åke Bernström
1975–1982: Kåre Svanfeldt
1982–1986: Owe Dahl
1986–1991: Bertil Lövdahl
1992–1998: Lars Dicander

See also
Swedish Armoured Troops
Swedish Engineer Troops
Swedish Army Service Troops
List of Swedish signal regiments

Footnotes

Footnotes

References

Further reading

Military communications units and formations of the Swedish Army
Military units and formations established in 1936
1936 establishments in Sweden